Made in Bangkok is a stage play written by Anthony Minghella. It was first performed on 18 March 1986 at the Aldwych Theatre, London with a cast including Felicity Kendal.

The play is set in Bangkok, Thailand in the 1980 and explicitly explores sex tourism and its ramifications.  The play won London Theatre Critics Award for best new play in 1986,

Cast:
 Felicity Kendal as Frances
 Peter McEnery as Edward
 Benjamin Whitrow as Adrian
 Paul Shelley as Stephen 
 David Yip as Net

References 

1986 plays
Plays set in Bangkok